The 1939–40 Drexel Dragons men's basketball team represented Drexel Institute of Technology during the 1939–40 men's basketball season. The Dragons, led by 1st year head coach Lawrence Mains, played their home games at Curtis Hall Gym.

Roster

Schedule

|-
!colspan=9 style="background:#F8B800; color:#002663;"| Exhibition
|-

|-
!colspan=9 style="background:#F8B800; color:#002663;"| Regular season
|-

References

Drexel Dragons men's basketball seasons
Drexel
1939 in sports in Pennsylvania
1940 in sports in Pennsylvania